The Automatix was an America, Detroit, Michigan based, rock/funk/pop band, formed in 1979 by Bruce Nazarian and fellow session musician, the drummer Jerome "Jerry" Jones.

The Automatix were signed to MCA Records by A&R man Joe Wissert and then-president Bob Siner in 1982, and their debut (and only) LP, Night Rider, was released in 1983.

In mid-1983, despite impending success, the band was dropped from the MCA artist roster following a re-organization of the label by incoming MCA Records President, Irving Azoff.

Members of the band featured on the album, besides Nazarian and Jones, include guitarists Randy Jacobs and Kenny Meriedith, bassist Nolan Mendenhall, and keyboardist James Noel. Original Automatix members Shaun Murphy, Luis Resto, and Hugh Hitchock did not participate in the recording, although they were an integral part of the original band.  Later members included keyboardist Mark Nilan  and guitarist Ray Goodman, but any recordings in which they participated have not been released.

References

Musical groups from Detroit
Musical groups established in 1979
1979 establishments in Michigan